Attestation may refer to: 
 Attestation clause, verification of a document
 Oath of Allegiance (United Kingdom)#Armed forces The date from which the service of a member of the armed forces begins is the date of attestation, on which the oath of allegiance is sworn (though the recruit might not report for training until a later date)
 Various police oaths in the United Kingdom
 The process of validating the integrity of a computing device such as a server needed for trusted computing
 Attested language
 Testimony